Charles Fehring (21 March 1899 – 30 November 1981) was an Australian rules footballer who played with Richmond and Essendon in the Victorian Football League (VFL).

A forward, Fehring was recruited from Surreys. He was Richmond's leading goal-kicker in the 1917 VFL season, despite kicking just 14 goals, from his 11 appearances. The following year he featured just once, but played nine games for Richmond in 1919. In the fourth round of the 1919 season, he played beside his brother Arthur, the only occasion that would appear together in the same VFL game.

Fehring spent the 1920 season in the Victorian Football Association, playing with Hawthorn. He joined Essendon in 1921 and kicked four goals in each of his first two games, against Geelong and South Melbourne respectively.

References

1899 births
1981 deaths
Australian rules footballers from Melbourne
Australian Rules footballers: place kick exponents
Richmond Football Club players
Essendon Football Club players
Hawthorn Football Club (VFA) players
People from Clifton Hill, Victoria